Diodati or Deodati is a family name. The Diodati were a patrician family from Lucca. In Lucca, in the sixteenth century, they commissioned the sculptor and architect Nicolao Civitalia to build the Palazzo Diodati now Palazzo Orsetti. They were forced to move to Geneva due to their adherence to the Protestant religion. The first to convert and to permanently reside in Geneva was Pompeo (1542-1602), son of Niccolò (of Alessandro) (1511-1544) and of his wife Zabetta Arnolfini. Pompeo became a disciple of Pier Martire Vermigli after having been exposed to reformist ideas during his travels to Piedmont and Lyon. In 1563 he was in Venice, in 1564 again in Lyons, in 1565 in Geneva; then in Montargis near Renata d'Este, when he returned to Lucca he was forced to abandon his city having been denounced to the Inquisition. He resided permanently in Geneva from 1572. Pompeo Diodati together with Francesco Turrettini, Orazio Micheli, Fabrizio Burlamacchi, Cesare Balbani, all fellow citizens of Lucca who were exiled for reasons of faith, created the cartel of Geneva silk merchants, called La Grande Boutique.

Notable people with the name include:
 Charles Diodati (1608?–1638), schoolmate and close friend of John Milton
 Élie Diodati (1576–1661), Genevan lawyer 
 Fred Diodati, lead singer of The Four Aces since 1956
 Giovanni Diodati or Deodati (1576–1649), Italian Protestant Bible scholar
 Lucio Diodati (born 1955), Italian painter 
 Roelof Deodati or Rodolfo Diodati, Dutch governor of Mauritius 1692–1703

See also 
 Villa Diodati, manor in Cologny near Lake Geneva, Switzerland

References